Jingpu "Paul" Liu is a geologist and professor at North Carolina State University.

Education
Ph.D. 2001 (Geological Oceanography), Virginia Institute of Marine Science (VIMS), College of Williams & Mary (W&M), Williamsburg. 
M.S. 1995 (Marine Geology), Institute of Oceanology, Chinese Academy of Sciences.
B.E., 1992 (Hydrology and Engineering Geology+Marine Geology), Ocean University of China.

Research
Fluxes and fates of river-derived sediments to the sea. 
Riverine sediment dispersal, transport, and accumulation in different continental margin environments, in particular those delatic and clinoform deposits from the large rivers in Asia, e.g. Yellow, Yangtze, Pearl, Red, Mekong, Irrawaddy, and Salween, etc;
The impacts of post-glacial sea-level changes, coastal environmental changes; beach and delta erosions.

Publications
Flux and fate of Yangtze River sediment delivered to the East China Sea JP Liu, KH Xu, AC Li, JD Milliman, DM Velozzi, SB Xiao, ZS Yang Geomorphology 85 (3-4), 208-224 (2007) (Cited 896 times, according to Google Scholar  ) 
Holocene development of the Yellow River's subaqueous delta, North Yellow Sea . JP Liu, JD Milliman, S Gao, P Cheng Marine geology 209 (1-4), 45-67 (2004) (Cited 748  times, according to Google Scholar. )  
Stepwise decreases of the Huanghe (Yellow River) sediment load (1950–2005): Impacts of climate change and human activities.  H Wang, Z Yang, Y Saito, JP Liu, X Sun, Y Wang, Global and Planetary Change  57 (3-4), 331-354 (2007) (Cited 693 times, according to Google Scholar. )  
Flux and fate of small mountainous rivers derived sediments into the Taiwan Strait  JP Liu, CS Liu, KH Xu, JD Milliman, JK Chiu, SJ Kao, SW Lin Marine Geology 256 (1-4), 65-76 (2008) 
Dispersal of the Zhujiang River (Pearl River) derived sediment in the Holocene Q Ge, JP Liu, Z Xue, F Chu Acta Oceanologica Sinica 33 (8), 1-9 (2014)
Stratigraphic Formation of the Mekong River Delta and Its Recent Shoreline Changes JP Liu, DJ DeMaster, TT Nguyen, Y Saito, VL Nguyen, TKO Ta, X Li Oceanography 30 (3), 72-83 (2017)
A seismic study of the Mekong subaqueous delta: Proximal versus distal sediment accumulation JP Liu, DJ DeMaster, CA Nittrouer, EF Eidam, TT Nguyen Continental Shelf Research 147, 197-212 (2017)
Sediment dispersal and accumulation off the Ayeyarwady delta–Tectonic and oceanographic controls SA Kuehl, J Williams, JP Liu, C Harris, DW Aung, D Tarpley, M Goodwyn, ... '''Marine Geolog'y 417, 106000 (2019)

References 

American geologists
North Carolina State University faculty
Living people

Year of birth missing (living people)